The Anthony M. McColl House is a historic dwelling located in Woodward, Iowa, United States.  McColl settled in Dallas County, Iowa with his family in 1877. He was a local businessman who served as mayor of Woodward and two terms in the Iowa Senate as a Republican.  He resigned his Senate seat to take a seat of the State Board of Control, which he served on for 18 years.  He was also board chairman for several terms.  While on the board he was able to influence the location of the "Iowa Hospital for Epileptics and School for Feeble Minded" in Woodward.  It would later be called the Woodward State Hospital.  McColl bought this property in 1900 while he was mayor.  He had the house built 1903–1904 at the time he married Bessie Clyde Craft.  The two-story frame structure represents the transitional architectural period from the popularity of the Queen Anne style to the Neoclassical.  It was listed on the National Register of Historic Places in 1987.

References

Houses completed in 1904
Queen Anne architecture in Iowa
Houses in Dallas County, Iowa
National Register of Historic Places in Dallas County, Iowa
Houses on the National Register of Historic Places in Iowa
1904 establishments in Iowa